Robin Edmond Scott (born 1 April 1947) is an English singer and founder of a music project he called M. His career encompasses six decades.

Life and career

Early life 
Scott was born in Croydon, Surrey, where he attended Croydon Art College and met Malcolm McLaren in the late 1960s. Scott befriended McLaren and fashion guru Vivienne Westwood with whom he was to collaborate ten years later. He declined their offer to be involved in SEX, the Chelsea clothes shop which McLaren and Westwood launched, preferring to make his career in music.

While at college he had displayed a talent for writing topical songs which he performed on radio and television. This led to his debut album, for which he was backed by Mighty Baby.  Woman From the Warm Grass was released on a small independent record label called Head Records.

Scott began performing his own songs and accompanying himself on guitar. He spent a period playing folk music clubs as a solo musician, sharing bills with emerging artists such as David Bowie, John Martyn and Ralph McTell. He also recorded a session for the BBC, one of the tracks from which was included on the CD reissue of the album in 2001.

1970s 
In early 1970, Scott conceived a multimedia project, The Voice, which was aired on BBC Radio 3. He left Britain to travel both around Europe and North America. When he returned, he made demos with members of the progressive rock band Camel, songwriter Terry Britten and music publisher Ronnie Scott. In 1972, he won the Search for a Star national talent contest, and was offered a recording contract by EMI, but turned down the deal because the label would not support his backing band.

In 1973, he performed in bands with Pete Thomas (later of Elvis Costello and the Attractions), and Paul "Bassman" Riley, and also wrote a musical called Heartaches & Teardrops, a play with original songs which has parallels to The Rocky Horror Show, and the True Love and Romance comic strip genre.

Scott then started working with Roogalator, a well regarded and original R&B band. He produced their debut single, "Cincinnati Fatbac" (one of the first releases on Stiff Records) followed by "Love & the Single Girl" on Virgin. Virgin failed to pick up option to release the band's first album so Scott produced Roogalator's debut LP Play It By Ear for release on Do It Records which he co-founded in 1978 with Max and Ian Tregoning. Scott also recorded "Cry Myself to Sleep" under the alias of Comic Romance, for release on Do It.

In 1978, Scott worked as producer for Barclay Records in Paris, France where he lived with his girlfriend Brigitte Vinchon (alias Brigit Novik), after producing and filming with director Julien Temple and all female punk quartet The Slits. In 1979 Do It released early recordings by Adam and the Ants.

Breakthrough 
While still in Paris he recorded early versions of "Moderne Man" and "Satisfy Your Lust", tracks which would ultimately appear on the first M album.

Using a group of session musicians he called "M", he also produced and recorded "Pop Muzik". It became a top 40 hit in the UK and popular again in 1989 when it was remixed and re-released. Among the other musicians who played on the track were his brother Julian Scott (on bass), then-unknown keyboardist Wally Badarou, Canadian programmer John Lewis and backing vocalist Brigit Novik. When it was released in the UK in early 1979, it became a hit, reaching No. 2 on the UK Singles Chart and No. 1 in the US, after which MCA Records, the label which had released the single, requested he record an album.

New York • London • Paris • Munich was recorded in Montreux, Switzerland, at Queen's Mountain Studios, and using their regular engineer, David Richards as well as Julian Scott, Wally Badarou (who would later work with Stevie Winwood, among others) and Brigit Novik. Additional musicians on the LP included drummer Phil Gould (later of Level 42), Gary Barnacle on saxophone and flute, and (at the time) local Montreux resident David Bowie, who did occasional handclaps. Released in the UK at the end of 1979 and on Sire Records in the US, the album sold well.

In contrast to "Pop Muzik", another track titled "Moonlight and Muzak" was released in late 1979 as the third single from the album, peaking at No. 33 in the UK. MCA executives were unhappy with this change of direction, but with a hit behind him, Scott felt it was relevant to be heard at this point. The track was written as a result of his experiences in the U.S. where he came into contact with the music company called the Muzak Organisation. He described it as "a very weird experience. There were all these white collar workers conscientiously putting together music with the precision of chemists. Way before Brian Eno was doing it, these guys were doing it for real. They were pre-occupied with the pace of workers in factories, and how to maximise their efficiency."

The song was a UK Top 40 hit, and then "That's the Way the Money Goes" became another charting hit inside of a year. A 45-minute film incorporating videos and concert performances to date came as a result of a quick globe-trotting world tour in the wake of the hit.

Other M releases 
In late 1980, the follow-up album called The Official Secrets Act was released, containing the songs "Keep It to Yourself" and the title track, and was inspired, albeit tongue-in-cheek, by the overwhelming worldwide paranoia of the time. It was recorded in the UK and Dublin, with contributions from Bill Whelan (the man behind Riverdance, who at the time worked as an arranger). Among the musicians on the album were Phil Gould on drums again, who also introduced his friend and subsequent Level 42 colleague Mark King. King at the time played guitar as much as bass; these recordings took place prior to his discovery of his trademark sound. In 1981, Scott co-produced rising star Ryuichi Sakamoto, along with fellow members of the Yellow Magic Orchestra (who also participated on subsequent albums Left Handed Dream  and The Arrangement), as did King Crimson/David Bowie guitarist Adrian Belew, while Scott and Brigit Novik supplied vocals and co-wrote four tracks.

The same year brought a third M album Famous Last Words, which featured many of the musicians from the previous albums, including the early incarnation of Level 42 (who by this time were having their own regular hits), producer Wally Badarou also playing keyboards, Julian Scott on bass, Brigit Novik on backing vocals, a young Thomas Dolby on programming, Yellow Magic Orchestra drummer Yukihiro Takahashi, guitarist from Gang of Four Andy Gill and Tony Levin on bass. MCA declined release of the album in the UK, and it was only released in France, Italy and the US (where M was not even signed).

Subsequently, the label and M parted company. At this point some role reversing took place and Scott produced the M single "Danube" for the Stiff label, featuring Brigit Novik on vocals, followed by "The Wedding Dance" presenting Novik as an artist in her own right.

African phase 
As a development of the ethnic references on The Official Secrets Act and the Stiff releases, Scott found a new musical direction, producing an EP of African acts in Kenya. This led to the album Jive Shikisha! (credited to Robin Scott & Shikisha), recorded in Kenya and the UK between 1983 and 1984, with musicians from several different African states. The album featured a female vocal trio from South Africa, Shikisha (hence the album title), Wally Badarou and Julian Scott.

Most of this world music was originally suppressed, but was remastered and released in 2003. The resurgence of interest in Scott and the history of "Pop Muzik" follows U2's use of the Steve Osborne remix opening their PopMart tour. Remixes have come from all sides, from Marcus' "Pop Muzic 2001" in 2002, and by Junior Vasquez and the Dub Pistols in 2003.

In 2003 a collection of Scott's artwork was shown at the Ensign Gallery in London. and a compilation including both retrospective studio recording and period demos was released with title of Life Class featuring artwork from the exhibition.

Scott appeared in the Countdown Spectacular two-concert series in Australia between late August and early September 2007, where he performed "Pop Muzik" live for the first time. In 2009, an album featuring the original 1979 mix and thirteen remixes of "Pop Muzik" was issued by Union Square.

Recent work
In August 2017, Scott released his latest album Emotional DNA in digital format.

Discography
Woman from the Warm Grass (1969)
New York • London • Paris • Munich (1979), Sire
The Official Secrets Act (1980), Sire
Famous Last Words (1982), Sire
High Life Music EP (1983), Swahili/Albion
Life Class (2003), Yup!
Pop Muzik – The Remix Album (2010), Union Square
Emotional DNA (2017), self-released

Collaborations
Left Handed Dream (1981), Epic – Ryuichi Sakamoto featuring Robin Scott
The Arrangement (1982), Alfa – Ryuichi Sakamoto featuring Robin Scott
Jive Shikisha! † (1998) Recorded in 1984 – Robin Scott & Shikisha

Singles

References

External links
 Robin Scott at Discogs

1947 births
Living people
English new wave musicians
English male singer-songwriters
People from Croydon
British synth-pop new wave musicians
Male new wave singers